Public transport in Auckland, the largest metropolitan area of New Zealand, consists of three modes: bus, train and ferry. Services are coordinated by Auckland Transport under the AT Metro brand. Britomart Transport Centre is the main transport hub.

Until the 1950s Auckland was well served by public transport and had high levels of ridership. However, the dismantling of an extensive tram system in the 1950s, the decision by Stan Goosman to not electrify Auckland's rail network, and a focus of transport investment into a motorway system led to the collapse in both mode share and total trips. By the 1990s Auckland had experienced one of the sharpest declines in public transport ridership in the world, with only 33 trips per capita per year.

Since 2000, a greater focus has been placed on improving Auckland's public transport system through a series of projects and service improvements. Major improvements include the Britomart Transport Centre, the Northern Busway, the upgrade and electrification of the rail network and the introduction of integrated ticketing through the AT HOP Card. These efforts have led to sustained growth in ridership, particularly on the rail network. Between June 2005 and November 2017 total ridership increased from 51.3 million boardings per annum to 90.9 million.

Despite those strong gains, the overall share of travel in Auckland by public transport is still quite low. At the 2013 census around 8% of journeys to work were by public transport and per capita ridership in 2017 of around 55 boardings is still well below that of Wellington, Sydney, Melbourne, Perth and most large Canadian cities.

Auckland's rapid population growth means that improving the city's public transport system is a priority for Auckland Council and the New Zealand Government. Major improvements planned or underway include the City Rail Link, extending the Northern Busway to Albany, construction of the Eastern Busway between Panmure and Botany, and the proposed Auckland Airport Line, a light rail line between the city centre and Auckland Airport.

History

Pre World War II growth 
Horse-drawn trams operated in Auckland from 1884. The Auckland Electric Tram Company's system was officially opened on 17 November 1902. The Electric Tram Company started as a private company before being acquired by Auckland City Council.

The tram network enabled and shaped much of Auckland's growth throughout the early 20th century. Auckland's public transport system was very well utilised, with usage peaking at over 120 million boardings during the Second World War, when Auckland's population was less than 500,000.

Post World War II decline 
Auckland's extensive tram network was removed in the 1950s, with the last line closing in late 1956. Although a series of ambitious rail schemes were proposed between the 1940s and 1970s, the focus of transport improvements in Auckland shifted to developing an extensive motorway system. Passionate advocacy from long-time Mayor of Auckland City Council Dove-Myer Robinson for a "rapid rail" scheme was ultimately unsuccessful.

Removal of the tram system, little investment in Auckland's rail network and growing car ownership in the second half of the 20th century led to a collapse in ridership across all modes of public transport. From a 1954 average level of 290 public transport trips per person per year (a share of 58% of all motorised trips), patronage decreased rapidly. 1950s ridership levels were only reached again in the 2010s, despite Auckland's population growing four-fold over the same time period.

These decisions also shaped Auckland's growth patterns in the late 20th century, with the city becoming a relatively low-density dispersed urban area with a population highly dependent on private vehicles for their travel needs. By the late 1990s ongoing population growth and high levels of car use were leading to the recognition that traffic congestion was one of Auckland's biggest problems.

Privatisation 
It has been claimed that the city's public transport decline resulted from, "privatisation, a poor regulatory environment and a funding system that favours roads". On the other hand, NZ Bus claim that increasing passengers and cost control began with privatisation in 1991.

21st century revival 
As concerns over urban sprawl and traffic congestion grew in the 1990s and early 2000s, public transport returned to the spotlight, with growing agreement of the "need for a substantial shift to public transport". Growing recognition that Auckland could no longer "build its way out of congestion" through more roads alone led to the first major improvements to Auckland's public transport system in half a century:
 The Britomart Transport Centre was opened in 2003, the first major upgrade of Auckland's rail network since World War II. This project allowed trains to reach into the heart of Auckland's city centre and acted as a catalyst for the regeneration of this part of downtown Auckland.
 The Northern Busway was opened in 2008, providing Auckland's North Shore with rapid transit that enabled bus riders to avoid congestion on the Northern Motorway and Auckland Harbour Bridge.
 A core upgrade of Auckland's rail network between 2006 and 2011, known as Project DART, which included double-tracking of the Western Line, the reopening of the Onehunga Branch line to Onehunga, a rail spur to Manukau City and a series of station upgrades.
 Electrification of the Auckland rail network (except for the section of track between Papakura and Pukekohe) and the purchase of new electric trains from Spanish manufacturer CAF. Electric train services commenced in 2014.
 Implementation of an integrated ticketing and fares system, through the AT HOP card, enabling consistent fares and easy transfers between different bus, train and ferry operators.

Despite these improvements, the lack of investment in Auckland's public transport system throughout the latter part of the 20th century means the city still has much lower levels of ridership than other major cities in Canada and Australia. Auckland's ongoing strong population growth and constrained geography means that Auckland's transport plans now have a strong focus on further improving the quality and attractiveness of public transport. Further improvements are to be realised in the years to 2028 under the Auckland Transport Alignment Project (ATAP), valued at NZ$28 billion ($4.6 billion more than previously planned), of which $9.1 billion is for additional public transport projects, including: the completion of the City Rail Link; the construction of the Eastern Busway, which will run from Panmure to Botany; Northern Busway extension to Albany; the extension of the railway electrification to Pukekohe; a third line to Auckland between Westfield and Wiri or Wiri and Papakura, to allow freight trains to bypass stationary passenger trains; further new electric trains and the construction of a light rail network to the northwest (to be designed) and to the airport.

In late January 2022, the New Zealand Government approved a NZ$14.6 billion project to establish a partially tunneled light rail network between Auckland Airport and the Wynyard Quarter in the Auckland CBD. The proposed light rail network will integrate with current train and bus hubs as well as the City Rail Link's stations and connections. Transport Minister Michael Wood also added that the Government would decide on plans to establish a second harbour crossing at Waitemata Harbour in 2023.

Buses

Urban services 

Buses provide for around 70% of public transport trips in Auckland. Bus services generally run from around 6am to midnight, with a limited number of buses linking Auckland's suburbs and city centre after midnight on Friday and Saturday nights only, with Northern Express services on the Northern Busway on the North Shore running half-hourly until 3:00 a.m.

Services are contracted by Auckland Transport and operated by a number of private companies, including:
Bayes Coachlines
Birkenhead Transport
Go Bus
Howick and Eastern Buses
NZ Bus
Pavlovich Coachlines 
Ritchies Transport
 Tranzurban Auckland (Tranzit Group) – contracted operator of NX2 services on the Northern Busway
Waiheke bus company (by Fullers, 5 routes)

Auckland Transport began rebranding bus services to AT Metro in 2014–2015 to create a single identity for all bus services, with some exceptions like the Link buses which retained their red, green and orange colours.

There are five Link services; all accept fare payment by AT HOP card or cash and all run from early morning to late evening, 7 days of the week.
CityLink – red electric buses; Wynyard Quarter – Queen Street – Karangahape Road
InnerLink – green buses – both way loop; Britomart – Parnell – Newmarket – Karangahape Road – Ponsonby Road – Victoria Park – Britomart.
OuterLink – amber buses – both way loop; Wellesley Street – Parnell – Newmarket – Mount Eden – Mount Albert – Westmere – Herne Bay – Wellesley Street.
TāmakiLink – blue buses; Britomart – Spark Arena – Kelly Tarlton's Sea Life Aquarium – Mission Bay – Kohimarama Beach – St Heliers Bay – Glen Innes.
AirportLink – orange electric buses; Manukau - Puhinui - Auckland Airport
SkyBus provides services between Auckland Airport and Auckland CBD.

Bus priority facilities 

Auckland has a growing number of bus lanes, some of which operate at peak times only and others 24 hours a day. These lanes are for buses and two-wheeled vehicles only and are intended to reduce congestion and shorten travel times. All are sign-posted and marked on the road surface.

The Central Connector bus lane project improved links between Newmarket and the inner city, while bus lanes are also planned on Remuera Road and St Johns Road to connect the city with the Eastern Bays suburbs.

The Northern Busway provides complete separation for buses from general traffic between Akoranga (near Takapuna) and Constellation Drive. This busway is to be extended further north to Albany busway station including building a new station at Rosedale. In the long-term plans remain to extend the busway to Hibiscus Coast busway station, and Orewa.

The Eastern Busway (AMETI) is currently being constructed to connect Botany and Panmure with a separated busway along Ti Rakau Drive, onto Pakuranga Road and Lagoon Drive. Pre-construction began in late 2018, with the removal of houses along Pakuranga Road due to be complete by April 2019. Stage one connecting Panmure and Pakuranga should be completed by 2020, with the Reeves Road flyover (2022) and continued construction of the busway from Pakuranga to Botany being completed by 2025. A new Botany station is due to be completed by 2026. Further extensions to Auckland Airport via Manukau City are being explored, although no decisions on this extension have been made public.

Other planned busways include the Northwestern Busway between Westgate and the city centre (possibly to be built as light-rail instead of a busway) and a bus connection between Auckland Airport, Manukau City and Botany.

Commuter services 
At peak hours express buses serve commuters from the outlying towns north and south of Auckland.

Mahu City Express has run a commuter bus from Snells Beach to Parnell since October 2015. Since 1 March 2021 the first electric luxury coach in the country has been on the route. It uses a 40-seat Yutong TCe12, bought with the aid of a $352,500 EECA grant.

Bus 995 runs hourly, linking Warkworth to Hibiscus Coast busway station, with connection to the Northern Express, taking a bit over an hour to Auckland.

Waiuku's bus 395 links it to Papakura railway station twice a day.

Long-distance services 
Long-distance bus operator Intercity links Auckland with all the main centres in the North Island, also operating the budget-orientated SKIP Bus services. Skip buses were suspended from 25 March 2020. Until 18 August 1996 InterCity services operated from Auckland railway station. Since then they have run from Skycity. Skycity wants the bus station to move and it has been criticised for diesel fumes and poor toilets. However, InterCity rejected a move to Manukau and, in 2020, plans to move back to the old railway station were dropped.

Night services 
There are a total of 15 routes as part of the Night Bus and Northern Express bus services which operate on Friday and Saturday nights between the hours of 00:00 and 03:30. Most routes depart the city centre on an hourly basis although the Northern Express bus route NX1 is more frequent. The night bus services were paused during COVID but returned on 2 December 2021 when AT’s Group Manager Metro Services Stacey van der Putten noted that AT was "bringing back a wide range of our ‘Night Buses’ services this weekend to help support our city’s hospitality sector and to make it easier for town-goers and hospitality workers alike to get home safely and affordably in the early hours.”

Trains

Urban services 
Auckland's urban train services are operated under the AT brand by Auckland One Rail. Trains and stations are owned by Auckland Transport, while tracks and other rail infrastructure are owned by KiwiRail.

Since the opening of Britomart Transport Centre, significant improvements have been made to urban rail services. These include:
 Sunday services were reintroduced in October 2005 for the first time in over 40 years, together with a general 25% service frequency increase.
 Project DART upgraded the core rail network between 2006 and 2012, including double-tracking the Western Line, completed in 2010, constructing the Manukau Branch line from Wiri to Manukau City Centre, completed in 2012, rebuilding and reconfiguring Newmarket railway station, completed in 2010, and reopening the disused Onehunga Branch line for passengers in September 2010.
 Electrification of the rail network from Swanson station on the Western Line and Papakura station on the Southern Line and the purchase of 57 electric trains. The first passenger services operated in April 2014.
 Otahuhu railway station was extensively rebuilt to connect with a new bus interchange being built alongside. In October 2016, the interchange was opened to coincide with the launching of a new bus network timetable in South Auckland, Pukekohe and Waiuku.
 The new Manukau bus station (next to Manukau railway station) was officially opened in April 2018 and bus services from the new facility began, serving South and East Auckland.
 A bus and rail interchange at Puhinui connecting Auckland Airport to and from Manukau bus station, expected to begin its construction of the first stage in October 2019 and completed by early 2021, later expected to open on 26 July.

These improvements have led to rapid growth in rail ridership, from a low of 1 million annual boardings in 1994 to over 20 million in 2017. Increasing train frequencies to meet further growth is not possible because of the "dead end" at Britomart train station which means all trains entering and exiting the station need to use the same two tracks. The City Rail Link project, due to be opened in 2024 is a tunnel between Britomart to Mount Eden station designed to address these constraints, provide greater route flexibility across the entire network, and create a more direct route for Western Line services. This project will convert the system from a commuter rail network to an S-Train network, providing metro-like frequencies during peak.

Services
There are four commuter rail lines:

Rolling stock

Long-distance services 
Auckland has two long-distance passenger train services. The first is the Northern Explorer to Wellington, operated by KiwiRail Scenic Journeys, which runs southbound on Mondays, Thursdays and Saturdays and northbound Tuesdays, Fridays and Sundays. The service is mainly tourist-oriented.

The second is the Te Huia regional service, which runs one morning and one afternoon service each way between Hamilton and Auckland via The Base and Huntly. This service was extended from its initial northern termini of Papakura railway station to Puhinui railway station and The Strand Station in January 2022.

Future upgrades 
A number of upgrades and extensions to the rail network have been proposed, some for several decades:
From 13 August 2022, KiwiRail will be redeveloping Pukekohe station and the rail line to allow for Auckland Transport’s electric trains to travel between Pukekohe and Papakura. Pukekohe Station will close and the Pukekohe train service will be suspended until late 2024.
 The Auckland Airport Line, an extension of the Onehunga Branch line to Auckland Airport over the Mangere Bridge
 An airport link from the North Island Main Trunk line at Manukau City, in addition to or instead of a link via Mangere Bridge
 Extension of electrification to Pukekohe (including new stations at Drury Central, Drury West and Paerata), and eventually to Hamilton, although the Te Huia commuter train introduced in 2020 is diesel-hauled.
 The Avondale-Southdown Line, a line between Avondale in west Auckland and the Southdown Freight Terminal, to allow freight trains to avoid Newmarket and reduce delays for both freight and passenger trains
 A Third Main Line between Wiri and Westfield to allow freight trains to bypass stationary passenger trains on that section
 Extension of rail across Waitematā Harbour to the North Shore and possible conversion of the Northern Busway to light rail
In 2020, the government announced funding for electrification of the railway line from Papakura to Pukekohe, new railway stations at Drury, a third main line and improvements to the Wiri - Quay Park corridor.

Ferries

History 
The first official ferry started in 1854, the first steam ferry in 1860, the first scheduled ferry in 1865, Auckland & North Shore Steam Ferry Co in 1869, Devonport Steam Ferry Company in 1885, a vehicle ferry in 1911 and North Shore Ferries in 1959.

In 1981 George and Douglas Hudson bought North Shore Ferries and Waiheke Shipping Co. In 1984 they founded Gulf Ferries, and their first catamaran, the $3m Quickcat, cut the Waiheke ferry time from 75 minutes to 40, with Fullers putting Kea on the Devonport route from 1988. Fullers Corporation was mainly operating cruises and, in 1987, when they introduced Supercat III, they were refused a licence to compete on Waiheke commuter trips. The Hudsons bought Fullers from its 1988 receivership and formed Fullers Group Ltd in 1994 and Stagecoach took a majority holding in 1998. In 2009, Souter Holdings purchased Fullers Group and also 360 Discovery Cruises.

Services 
Around 7 million ferry trips per year are made in Auckland, on a variety of routes radiating from downtown Auckland. Ferry service operators are:
 Fullers360 Group
 SeaLink
 Belaire (West Harbour and Rakino Island)

Terminals 

The Auckland Ferry Terminal is in downtown Auckland on Quay Street, between Princes Wharf and the container port, directly opposite Britomart Transport Centre.
 North Shore terminals: Devonport, Bayswater, Northcote Point, Birkenhead, Beach Haven, Gulf Harbour
 East Auckland terminals: Half Moon Bay, Pine Harbour
 Waitematā Harbour's western terminals: West Harbour, Hobsonville

Ferries also connect the city with islands of the Hauraki Gulf. Regular sailings serve Waiheke Island, with less frequent services to Great Barrier Island, Rangitoto Island, Motutapu Island and other inner-gulf islands, primarily for tourism.

There are no ferry services on the west coast of Auckland, although there were some historical services from Onehunga. None are planned, as the city's waterfront orientation is much stronger towards the (eastern) Waitematā Harbour than to the (western) Manukau Harbour.

Ticketing and fares 

An integrated ticketing / smartcard system, known as the AT HOP Card, was developed for Auckland by Thales, similar to systems like Octopus card in Hong Kong.

The first stage of integrated ticketing came online in time for the Rugby World Cup 2011, with construction works for the 'tag on' / 'tag off' infrastructure having begun in January 2011. The 'HOP Card' was publicised with a $1 million publicity campaign that started in early 2011.

The AT HOP card system went live in October 2012 for trains, November 2012 for ferries and between June 2013 and March 2014 for buses.

In 2016, Auckland Transport simplified fares by changing to a system based on 13 fare zones. The fare is no longer based on the distance travelled (number of stages), but on the number of zones passed through, so that a journey in a zone that involves multiple rides or even a mode mix (bus or train) will be charged only one fare. Ferries are not included in the simplified fares system and are charged per ride.

Public advocacy 
A number of groups advocate for improving public transport in Auckland. Some groups operate prominent blogs, participate in public discussions on social media and prepare plans advocating for particular improvements. These groups include:
 Greater Auckland
 Campaign for Better Transport
 Public Transport Users Association
 Generation Zero

See also 
 List of Auckland railway stations
 Public transport in New Zealand
 Rail transport in New Zealand
 Transport in Auckland
 Trolleybuses in Auckland

References

External links 
 Auckland Transport (website of the region's local government transport body)
 ONTRACK New Zealand Railways Corporation (Rere Totika), the government rail owner
 Wheel Traffic (Tramways etc) in Cyclopaedia of New Zealand Volume II (Auckland) of 1902
 Photos of Downtown Municipal Transport Centre (now Britomart) in 1940s to 1970s

Public transport in Auckland
Articles containing video clips